Germán Kessler (born 1 July 1994) is a Uruguayan rugby union player who currently plays for Provence Rugby in France's Pro D2.

International career
In 2014, he was called by the Uruguayan U20 national team to compete at the 2014 IRB Junior World Rugby Trophy, having outstanding performances and helping the team finish 4th. 

In 2015 he was named in Uruguay's squad for the 2015 Rugby World Cup.

References

External links

1994 births
Living people
Expatriate rugby union players in the United States
Rugby union hookers
Rugby union players from Montevideo
Uruguay international rugby union players
Uruguayan expatriate rugby union players
Uruguayan expatriate sportspeople in the United States
Uruguayan people of German descent
Utah Warriors players
Uruguayan expatriate sportspeople in France
Expatriate rugby union players in France
Provence Rugby players
Soyaux Angoulême XV Charente players